The 1898 South Carolina gubernatorial election was held on November 8, 1898 to select the governor of the state of South Carolina. Governor William Haselden Ellerbe won the Democratic primary and ran unopposed in the general election to win a second term as governor.

Democratic primary
The South Carolina Democratic Party held their primary for governor on August 30 and incumbent Governor Ellerbe was the frontrunner. Claudius Cyprian Featherstone won second place in the primary to advance to the runoff on September 8, but came up short against Ellerbe.

General election
The general election was held on November 8, 1898 and William Haselden Ellerbe was reelected as the governor of South Carolina without opposition. Being a non-presidential election and few contested races, turnout was approximately half of that for the previous gubernatorial election.

 

|-
| 
| colspan=5 |Democratic hold
|-

See also
Governor of South Carolina
List of governors of South Carolina
South Carolina gubernatorial elections

References

"Election Returns." Reports and Resolutions of the General Assembly of the State of South Carolina. Volume I. Columbia, SC: The Bryan Printing Company, 1899, p. 256.

External links
SCIway Biography of Governor William Haselden Ellerbe

South Carolina
1898
Gubernatorial
November 1898 events